Eucomis bicolor, the variegated pineapple lily or just pineapple lily, is a bulbous species of flowering plant in the family Asparagaceae, subfamily Scilloideae, native to Southern Africa (the Cape Provinces, Lesotho, KwaZulu-Natal, the Free State, and the Northern Provinces). The pale green, purple-margined flowers are arranged in a spike (raceme), topped by a "head" of green leaflike bracts. It is cultivated as an ornamental bulbous plant, although its flowers have an unpleasant smell, attractive to the main pollinators, flies.

Description

Eucomis bicolor is a perennial growing from a large bulb. In late summer (August in the UK), it produces a stout stem (peduncule), often with purple markings. The inflorescence is terminated by a head (coma) of pale green leafy bracts, sometimes tinged with purple. At close quarters the flowers have a strongly unpleasant smell. The ovary is green.

The homoisoflavanones eucomin, eucomol, (E)-7-O-methyl-eucomin, (—)-7-O-methyleucomol, (+)-3,9-dihydro-eucomin and 7-O-methyl-3,9-dihydro-eucomin can be isolated from bulbs of E. bicolor.

Taxonomy
Eucomis bicolor was first described by John Gilbert Baker in 1878. The specific epithet bicolor means "two-coloured"; the tepals are pale green with purple margins. It is one of a group of larger tetraploid species of Eucomis, with 2n = 4x = 60.

Distribution and habitat
Eucomis bicolor is native to Southern Africa (the Cape Provinces, Lesotho, KwaZulu-Natal, the Free State, and the Northern Provinces).

Ecology

Eucomis bicolor is primarily pollinated by flies, including blowflies, house flies and flesh flies, attracted by the sulphur compounds in the scent of the flowers.

Cultivation
In cultivation, Eucomis bicolor is not fully frost-hardy. In the US, it is classed as hardy in USDA zones 8–10, and requires a winter mulch in colder areas (zones 6–7). Sun exposure and plentiful water are required in summer for successful flowering. It has gained the Royal Horticultural Society's Award of Garden Merit.

The cultivar E. bicolor 'Alba' has plain white flowers and lacks any purple coloration. It resembles Eucomis autumnalis but can be distinguished by the long flower stalks (pedicels).

References

External links

Scilloideae
Flora of the Cape Provinces
Flora of Lesotho
Flora of KwaZulu-Natal
Flora of the Free State
Flora of the Northern Provinces
Plants described in 1878
Taxa named by John Gilbert Baker